This list of University of Nebraska–Lincoln Olympians is a list of the athletes and coaches associated with the University of Nebraska–Lincoln who have competed in the Olympic Games.

A total of 111 athletes have combined to compete in 163 Olympic Games. Nebraska athletes have won 54 medals, including 16 gold medals, while representing 30 countries. Merlene Ottey is Nebraska's most decorated Olympian, winning nine medals and competing in seven Olympic Games, a record for track and field competitors.

Olympians

Summer Games

Athletes

Coaches

Winter Games

Athletes

Medalists

References

External links

Nebraska-Lincoln, University of
University of Nebraska–Lincoln Olympians
University of Nebraska–Lincoln Olympians